Dewas is a town in Dewas District. It may also refer to:
Dewas tehsil, the administrative division containing the town
Dewas district, a district in Madhya Pradesh, India
Dewas (Lok Sabha constituency), a constituency in Madhya Pradesh, India
Dewas (Vidhan Sabha constituency), a constituency in Madhya Pradesh, India
Dewas State, a territory within central India which was divided in 1728 into:
 Dewas Junior and Dewas Senior princely states
 Dewas Naka, a residential locality in Indore.

See also
Dewa (disambiguation)